The Blue Anchor Building (also known as the California Fruit Exchange) is a historic building located in Sacramento, California.

Description and history 
The Spanish Colonial Revival style commercial building was built in 1931, and was designed by the Starks and Flanders architecture firm. It is an "L" shaped, two-story structure constructed of steel and concrete, finished in stucco, and capped by a low-pitched red tile roof, and has a -story tower at the corner where the streets intersect.

The building was listed on the National Register of Historic Places on February 3, 1983.

See also
History of Sacramento, California
National Register of Historic Places listings in Sacramento County, California
California Historical Landmarks in Sacramento County, California

References

Buildings and structures in Sacramento, California
History of Sacramento, California
National Register of Historic Places in Sacramento, California
Commercial buildings on the National Register of Historic Places in California
Commercial buildings completed in 1931
Spanish Colonial Revival architecture in California